Tim Hamilton may refer to:

Tim Hamilton (designer), American fashion designer
Tim Hamilton (equestrian), paralympic equestrian from Canada
Tim Hamilton (director), American filmmaker; directed first feature, Mama's Boy in 2007; Palme d'Or nomination (Truth in Advertising, 2001)